Tullio Liberati Jr. (born  1968) is an American politician serving as a member of the Michigan House of Representatives from the 13th district. Elected in 2020, he assumed office on January 1, 2021.

Early life and education
Liberati was born around 1968 in Allen Park, Michigan. Liberati graduated from St. Frances Cabrini High School in 1986. Liberati studied biology at Wayne State University.

Career
Around 2000, Liberati founded and is the current president of the company Liberati and Sons Construction. On November 3, 2020, Liberati was elected to the Michigan House of Representatives, where he has represented the 13th district since January 1, 2021. He succeeded his brother, term-limited State Representative Frank Liberati.

Personal life
Around 1994, Liberati married Connie. Together, they have two children. Liberati is Catholic.

References

Living people
1960s births
American Catholics
Businesspeople from Michigan
Catholics from Michigan
Democratic Party members of the Michigan House of Representatives
People from Allen Park, Michigan
Wayne State University alumni
21st-century American businesspeople
21st-century American politicians